Below are the full rosters and coaching staff of the 11 teams of American Association of Professional Baseball.

East Division

Chicago Dogs

Cleburne Railroaders

Gary SouthShore RailCats

Kane County Cougars

Lake Country DockHounds

Milwaukee Milkmen

West Division

Fargo-Moorhead RedHawks

Kansas City Monarchs

Lincoln Saltdogs

Sioux City Explorers

Sioux Falls Canaries

Winnipeg Goldeyes

External links
American Association of Professional Baseball official website

 
Independent League team rosters